Bochner is a surname. Notable people with the surname include:

 Arthur P. Bochner, American communication scholar
 Hart Bochner (born 1956), Canadian film actor, screenwriter, director, and producer
 Lloyd Bochner (1924–2005), Canadian actor
 Mel Bochner (born 1940), American conceptual artist
 Salomon Bochner (1899–1982), American mathematician

See also 
 Büchner